W 101 may refer to:

101st meridian west, a line of latitude 101° west of the Mediterranean Sea 
, a dredger hopper ship in service 1944-47